Berrygil Creek is a creek in north west New South Wales, Australia.

References

Rivers of New South Wales
Murray-Darling basin